John Penn Arndt (November 25, 1780 – June 10, 1861) was an American merchant, pioneer, and legislator.

Born in Durham, Pennsylvania, Arndt built Durham boats with his family near Wilkes-Barre, Pennsylvania. He moved to Buffalo, New York, and then to Mackinac Island in Michigan Territory. In 1824, Arndt moved to Green Bay, Michigan Territory and then opened a saw mill in present-day Oconto County, Wisconsin in 1827. Arndt was a merchant, fur trapper, owned a ferry, and was an inn keeper. Arndt served in the first Wisconsin Territorial Council (upper house of the Wisconsin Territorial Legislature) from 1836–38; his son, Charles C. P. Arndt, also served in that body. He died in Green Bay, Wisconsin.

Notes

External links
 

1780 births
1861 deaths
People from Bucks County, Pennsylvania
Businesspeople from Buffalo, New York
People from Mackinac Island, Michigan
Politicians from Green Bay, Wisconsin
Members of the Wisconsin Territorial Legislature
Businesspeople from Pennsylvania
Businesspeople from Wisconsin
19th-century American politicians
Politicians from Buffalo, New York
19th-century American businesspeople